Dolanci is a small settlement east of Štanjel in the Municipality of Komen in the Littoral region of Slovenia.

References

External links

Dolanci on Geopedia

Populated places in the Municipality of Komen